Mohamed Daramy (born 7 January 2002) is a Danish professional footballer who plays as forward for Danish Superliga club Copenhagen, on loan from Eredivisie club Ajax, and the Denmark national team.

Club career

F.C. Copenhagen
Daramy joined Copenhagen from Hvidovre as a U14 player. He had the opportunity to join both Copenhagen and Brøndby, but ended up choosing Copenhagen. At the age of 15, Daramy was already the topscorer of the U17 squad at F.C. Copenhagen, which earned him a contract extension in October 2017 until 2020. He ended up scoring 18 goals in 26 games in the 2017–18 season, making him the fifth highest scoring player in that season's U17 league.

At the age of 16 years and 263 days, Daramy became the youngest ever player to score for Copenhagen. The goal came in his official debut for the club in a Danish Cup game against Viby IF. Afterwards, there were rumors about several clubs that were scouting Daramy, but especially RB Leipzig were rumored to be interested in the player. But Copenhagen didn't seem to want to let him go and put his price tag at €5 million. Daramy went out and said, that he didn't know yet whether he would stay or not.

Ultimately he decided to stay at the club and in March 2019 it was rumored, that he was about to sign a contract extension with a much higher salary, although there was a bid ready from an unknown club of about €5 million. He got his Danish Superliga debut on 2 December 2018 against AC Horsens. Daramy replaced Dame N'Doye in the 77th minute. On 31 March 2019, Daramy scored his first goal in the Danish Superliga. Daramy got the chance from start in the absence of Robert Skov who was out with an injury, and scored the game's only goal.

On 3 April 2019, Daramy officially signed his first professional contract with Copenhagen until the end of 2021. Beside that, he was also permanently promoted to the first team squad.

AFC Ajax
On 22 August 2021, AFC Ajax announced that they had closed a €12 million deal, which can increase to €13 million with bonuses, with Copenhagen for the transfer of Daramy. On 3 August 2022, Daramy returned to Copenhagen on a season-long loan.

International career
Daramy made his debut for Denmark national team on 1 September 2021 in a 2022 FIFA World Cup qualification match against Scotland, replacing Andreas Skov Olsen in the 85th minute.

Style of play
Former Schalke 04 striker and Denmark international Ebbe Sand, described Daramy as a player who is fast, strong in "one-on-one situations" and as "extremely talented".

Personal life
Daramy has a Sierra Leonean passport though he is born and raised in Denmark, because both his Oku parents are from Sierra Leone. In December 2018 Daramy revealed, that he had applied for a Danish passport and would like to play for the Danish national team.

Career statistics

Honours
Copenhagen
Danish Superliga: 2018–192021–22

Ajax
Eredivisie: 2021–22

References

External links
 Career stats - Voetbal International
 Mohamed Daramy on FC Copenhagen's website

Living people
2002 births
People from Hvidovre Municipality
Danish people of Sierra Leonean descent
Sportspeople from the Capital Region of Denmark
Sierra Leonean footballers
Danish men's footballers
Association football forwards
Denmark youth international footballers
Denmark under-21 international footballers
Denmark international footballers
Danish Superliga players
Eredivisie players
F.C. Copenhagen players
AFC Ajax players
Danish expatriate men's footballers
Danish expatriate sportspeople in the Netherlands
Expatriate footballers in the Netherlands